Donald Ross Aldworth (December 5, 1889 – January 21, 1961) was the head coach of the University of Maine's football team in 1918. He compiled a 3–1 record. Previously, he played football while he attended the University of Minnesota, serving as team captain in 1913. He graduated with a Bachelor of Science in forestry in 1914.

Head coaching record

References

External links
 

1889 births
1961 deaths
Maine Black Bears football coaches
Minnesota Golden Gophers football players
People from Lincoln County, Minnesota
Players of American football from Minnesota
Coaches of American football from Minnesota